The Downtown Oakland Historic District, in the Downtown Oakland area of Oakland, California, was listed on the National Register of Historic Places in 1998.  The listing included 43 contributing buildings, one contributing site and one contributing object.

The district is a roughly L-shaped irregular area comprising about 11 city blocks.  It includes Oakland's City Hall building, which is separately listed on the National Register.

References

External links

Oakland, California
Historic districts on the National Register of Historic Places in California
History of Oakland, California
National Register of Historic Places in Oakland, California
Geography of Oakland, California
Gothic Revival architecture in California
Beaux-Arts architecture in California
Moderne architecture in California